Eugène Moetbeek was a Belgian sprinter. He competed in the men's 100 metres event at the 1924 Summer Olympics.

References

External links
 

Year of birth missing
Year of death missing
Athletes (track and field) at the 1924 Summer Olympics
Belgian male sprinters
Olympic athletes of Belgium